Bernardo Filipe Governo O.F.M. Cap. (20 January 1939 − 20 October 2013) was a Mozambican Roman Catholic bishop. Ordained to the priesthood in October 1969 for the Capuchin order, Governo was named bishop of the Roman Catholic Diocese of Quelimane, Mozambique in 1976 and resigned in March 2007.

References

1939 births
2013 deaths
People from Zambezia Province
20th-century Roman Catholic bishops in Mozambique
Capuchin bishops
21st-century Roman Catholic bishops in Mozambique
Roman Catholic bishops of Quelimane